ICESat (Ice, Cloud, and land Elevation Satellite) was a NASA satellite mission for measuring ice sheet mass balance, cloud and aerosol heights, as well as land topography and vegetation characteristics. It operated as part of NASA's Earth Observing System (EOS). It operated for seven years before being retired in February 2010, after its scientific payload shut down and scientists were unable to restart it.

The ICESat mission was designed to provide elevation data needed to determine ice sheet mass balance as well as cloud property information, especially for stratospheric clouds common over polar areas. It provides topography and vegetation data around the globe, in addition to the polar-specific coverage over the Greenland and Antarctic ice sheets. The satellite was found useful in assessing important forest characteristics, including tree density.

Satellite instruments 
The sole instrument on ICESat was the Geoscience Laser Altimeter System (GLAS), a space-based lidar. GLAS combined a precision surface lidar with a sensitive dual-wavelength cloud and aerosol lidar. The GLAS lasers emit infrared and visible laser pulses at 1064- and 532-nm wavelengths. As ICESat orbited, GLAS produced a series of approximately  diameter laser spots that were separated by nearly  along the spacecraft's ground track. During the commissioning phase of the mission, the ICESat was placed into an orbit which allowed the ground track to repeat every 8 days. During August and September 2004, the satellite was maneuvered into a 91-day repeating ground track for the main portion of the mission.

Operational history 
ICESat was designed to operate for three to five years. Testing indicated that each GLAS laser should last for two years, requiring GLAS to carry three lasers in order to fulfill the nominal mission length. During the initial on orbit test operation, a pump diode module on the first GLAS laser failed prematurely on 29 March 2003. A subsequent investigation indicated that a corrosive degradation of the pump diodes, due to an unexpected but known reaction between indium solder and gold bonding wires, had possibly reduced the reliability of the lasers. Consequentially, the total operational life for the GLAS instrument was expected to be as little as less than a year as a result. After the two months of full operation in the fall of 2003, the operational plan for GLAS was changed, and it was operated for one-month periods out of every three to six months in order to extend the time series of measurements, particularly for the ice sheets. The last laser failed on 11 October 2009, and following attempts to restart it, the satellite was retired in February 2010. Between 23 June 2010 and 14 July 2010, the spacecraft was maneuvered into a lower orbit in order to speed up orbital decay. On 14 August 2010, it was decommissioned, and at 08:49 UTC on 30 August 2010 it reentered the atmosphere.

Follow-on satellite 
A follow-on mission, ICESat-2, was developed by NASA to continue studying polar ice changes, and the biomass and carbon in vegetation. The satellite was launched on 15 September 2018 aboard a Delta II launch vehicle. For the period of time in between the two satellites, NASA's Operation IceBridge used a Douglas DC-8 aircraft as a stopgap to measure ice thickness and collect other data.

References

External links 

 ICESAT by NASA's Goddard Space Flight Center
 ICESAT/GLAS by the Center for Space Research, University of Texas

Further reading 
 

Earth satellite laser altimeters
Earth observation satellites of the United States
Spacecraft launched in 2003
Spacecraft launched by Delta II rockets
Spacecraft which reentered in 2010
NASA satellites